The 1996–97 Taça de Portugal was the 57th edition of the Portuguese football knockout tournament, organized by the Portuguese Football Federation (FPF). The 1996–97 Taça de Portugal began in September 1996. The final was played on 10 June 1997 at the Estádio Nacional.

Benfica were the previous holders, having defeated Sporting CP 3–1 in the previous season's final. Boavista defeated cup holders Benfica, 3–2 in the final to win their fifth Taça de Portugal. As a result of Boavista winning the domestic cup competition, the Axadrezados faced 1996–97 Primeira Divisão winners Porto in the 1997 Supertaça Cândido de Oliveira.

Sixth round
Ties were played between the 9 March and the 22 April. Due to the odd number of teams involved at this stage of the competition, Maia qualified for the quarter-finals due to having no opponent to face at this stage of the competition.

Quarter-finals
Ties were played between the 2 April and the 7 May.

Semi-finals
Ties were played between the 30 April and 21 May.

Final

References

Taça de Portugal seasons
Taca De Portugal, 1996-97
1996–97 domestic association football cups